The Secunderabad Club is an elite club located in Secunderabad, India. 

It is one of the five oldest clubs in India, the oldest club being the Bengal Club of Calcutta. The club went through four name changes before the name Secunderabad Club was finally chosen. The club was established on 26 April 1878 and was originally known as the Secunderabad Public Rooms. It was subsequently renamed the Secunderabad Garrison Club, the Secunderabad Gymkhana Club and the United Services Club.

The earliest records state that this Club was formed by the British Army Garrisons that were stationed in Secunderabad under an agreement with the 3rd Nizam - Sikandar Jah. The Club was then known as Garrison Club.

Over 15 to 20 years the British presence in Hyderabad increased and the British brought in their civilian officers to look after the Nizam's Railways, as well as the judicial system to administer the cantonment area.

The Nizam also requisitioned the British Officers to help him set up the electrical, waterworks and various revenue reforms in the state. During the late 19th century, the name of Garrison Club was changed to United Services Club representing the membership from all parts of the services. The Club was no longer an army club and it served all the services represented by the British.

As time went by, the officers later changed the name to Secunderabad Club since it was situated in Secunderabad. This name change coincided with the presentation by Salar Jung I who was the Prime Minister of Hyderabad State to the resident at that point of time of his hunting lodge. The club came to its current location in March 1903.

The story goes that the Club was situated in a small run-down building and when the Resident desired to come to the Club, Salar Jung got to know of it and offered his hunting lodge as a fitting building to house the club where the Resident could come in and spend his evening.

Accordingly, the rules of the Secunderabad Club mention that the Salar Jungs lineal descendants will be made members of Secunderabad Club without ballot or admission fee which is followed to this day. The Club is situated in the Tokatta village, which was Salar Jung’s Jagir.

The historical papers and documents speak of Cantonment Area which is most of Secunderabad, but when the areas were handed over for Administration purpose only to the Britishers, the fairways or law promulgated by the Nizam states that those areas, which are under the occupation of his Nawabs and Jagirdhars, will not be disturbed by the Britishers.

Until 1947, there were only British Presidents of the Club and a few high-ranking nobility were offered membership and were members of the Secunderabad Club.

The First Indian President was Major General El Edross who was in the Hyderabad Army. After that when the Indian Armed forces overran Hyderabad in September 1948, General Choudary commander of the Indian Armed Forces became the President for a few months. Immediately thereafter the Club went into the Indian hands and Mirza Najaf Alikhan an ICS Officer was elected as the President of the Club in 1948 and then became the receiver of Salar Jung estate when Salar Jung III died in 1950.

The Club has some of the finest facilities. The food courts and restaurants in the club have something for everyone’s palate – be it continental food or traditional Indian fare. An exotic Lebanese food stall is the latest addition. For those inclined for a full course meal, a well-appointed dinner lounge is a place to visit. No description of the Club will be complete without a word about its well-appointed bars. The prime bar, the AC Bar, is a cosy air-conditioned cocoon.

The Golf Club was eventually taken over by the army in 1983 after the expiry of the lease period. The Hyderabad Sailing Week organised every July throws the Club into sharp focus for supporting the city’s tryst with sailing.

The Club has a busy social calendar, with musical nites, tombola evenings, plays and movies. There are extensive facilities for indoor and outdoor games. The swimming pool is the focal point of the hot Indian summers. Basketball, squash and tennis courts abound. A well-maintained cricket ground is a host to many an interesting cricket game – apart from being the training ground for many of the city’s future cricketers who learn the ropes in the Club’s coaching camps organised especially during the summer holidays.

Membership to the Club is extremely difficult to get these days. The Club has slowed down on granting new memberships due to a large member - base. Memberships are bequeathed across generations by the members, much like family heirlooms.

In the early hours of the 15th of January, 2022, a devastating and massive fire completely gutted the 144-year-old historic main building.

The club's Colonnade Bar, billiards room and the administration office are among the structures that were destroyed in the fire.

The fire is believed to have started in the barroom between 12 and 1 am, and by 3 am, when seven fire tenders were rushed the entire building was on fire. Initial attempts by some club staff to put out the fire did not help with the liquor stores of the club also catching fire.

See also 
 List of India's gentlemen's clubs

References

External links

 
 

Gentlemen's clubs in India
Buildings and structures in Secunderabad
Culture of Hyderabad, India
Sport in Secunderabad
1878 establishments in British India